Kaisten may refer to:

Kaisten in Aargau, Switzerland
Kaisten in Bavaria, Germany